Derotettix is a genus of cicada in the Derotettigini tribe of the Derotettiginae subfamily native to Argentina. Two species have been described.

References

Cicadidae genera